

Canada 
 Shell Lake, Saskatchewan, a community in Saskatchewan
 Shell Lake murders
 Big Shell Lake, a lake in Saskatchewan
 Shell Lake (Saskatchewan), a lake in Saskatchewan
 Rural Municipality of Shell Lake No. 495
 Inuvik/Shell Lake Water Aerodrome

United States 
 Shell Lake, Wisconsin
 Shell Lake Municipal Airport
 Shell Lake Township, Minnesota
 Shell Lake National Wildlife Refuge, a protected area in North Dakota

US Lakes
 Shell Lake (Becker County, Minnesota)
 Shell Lake (Wisconsin)